Mwatate is a town in Taita-Taveta County, Kenya. It is the county capital, although it is the fourth-largest town in the county. Other urban centers in Taita-Taveta County include Voi, Wundanyi and Taveta.

Location

The coordinates of Mwatate are: 03°30'17.0"S, 38°22'40.0"E (Latitude:-3.504720; Longitude:38.377782).

Overview
Mwatate held the headquarters of the whole district during the British colonial rule from 1900 to 1912, when the headquarters moved to Voi.
Teita Sisal Estate, one of the largest sisal estates in world, is also located near the town of Mwatate.

Population
In 2011, the population of Taita-Taveta County was quoted at 284,657. As of May 2015, the population of Mwatate town was estimated at 1.95 percent of the county population, about 5,551 people. The population of the town has increased in recent years partly because of people migrating to town to establish businesses and others are attracted by the lucrative business of buying and selling the precious stone called Tsavorite, that is found around the area.

References

External links
Website of Taita-Taveta County, Kenya

Populated places in Kenya
Populated places in Taita-Taveta County